Juan Carlos Muñoz Navarro (born 4 April 1968) is a Chilean former professional footballer who played as a winger.

Career
Born in Peralillo, specifically in the  area, he began his career with Unión Santa Cruz in the Chilean Segunda División at the end of the 1980s. After having few chances to play, he played for Juventud Ferro from Chimbarongo and Unión Veterana from Peumo in the Tercera División. 

In 1991 he moved to Colchagua along with his brother Osvaldo, who played as a defender. With Colchagua, they almost got promotion to the Primera División in the 1994 Segunda División de Chile. The Muñoz brothers also played for Everton in 1996, and Rangers in 1997, winning the 1997 Apertura of the Primera B.

In second half 1997, he moved to the Chilean Primera División side Deportes La Serena, making 15 appearances and scoring 3 goals in his first stint. At the end of the match between Deportes La Serena and Croatia Zagreb, where Muñoz scored a goal, he took a picture alongside Robert Prosinečki, who recommended his signing for Croatia Zagreb, becoming the first Chilean in the Croatian football, aged 29.

For Croatia Zagreb, he made his debut scoring a goal against Hajduk Split and won both the 1997–98 Croatian First Football League and the 1997–98 Croatian Football Cup, but after his daughter became seriously ill, he returned to Deportes La Serena, where he retired in 2001.

As curiosities, the President of Everton in 1996, Jorge "Loco" Castillo, confused the Muñoz brothers with truck driver's mates and requested them to move some chairs. In addition, when he joined Deportes La Serena, Raúl Aredes mistook him for a club fan looking for an autograph.

Personal life
His brother, Osvaldo, is a former football defender with whom he coincided in Colchagua, Everton and Rangers.

As a player of Colchagua, he was nicknamed El Hijo del Viento (The Wind's Son) due to his speed, as the footballer Franz Arancibia.

After his retirement, he worked in the mining industry, and for Nestlé Chile.

He was honored as an important person from Peralillo by the municipality of the town.

Honours
Rangers
 Primera B: 1997 Apertura

Croatia Zagreb
 Croatian First Football League: 1997–98
 Croatian Football Cup: 1997–98

References

1968 births
Living people
People from Colchagua Province
Chilean footballers
Chilean expatriate footballers
Deportes Santa Cruz footballers
Deportes Colchagua footballers
Everton de Viña del Mar footballers
Rangers de Talca footballers
Deportes La Serena footballers
GNK Dinamo Zagreb players
Primera B de Chile players
Tercera División de Chile players
Chilean Primera División players
Croatian Football League players
Chilean expatriate sportspeople in Croatia
Expatriate footballers in Croatia
Association football forwards